Matthew Jerome Barr (born February 14, 1984) is an American actor, best-known as Danny McNamara in the CBS/Paramount+ action–adventure television series Blood & Treasure
and as Johnson "Johnse" Hatfield in Hatfields & McCoys. 

Barr also played Mike Fleming in Commander in Chief, Ian Banks in One Tree Hill, Christopher Sullivan in the mystery-horror limited series Harper's Island, and Dan Patch in The CW series Hellcats.

Early life

Matthew Jerome Barr was born on February 14, 1984, in Allen, Texas, a suburb of Dallas, to Mike Barr, a former football coach at Purdue University and Southern Methodist University, who is now in the real estate business, and DeDe Barr, a portrait artist. Barr has a younger brother, Luke, and sister, Sara. When Barr was in fourth grade, his family moved to Fairview, Texas, another Dallas suburb.

Barr was active in the Allen High School theater program, and had major roles in many school plays and musical theater productions. This included the role of Tommy in Meredith Willson's The Music Man, and a court jester in the school's madrigal dinner.

While a high school senior, Barr learned that Richard Linklater was planning a film about football in Austin, Friday Night Lights. He auditioned for a role. Although this movie ended up being put on hold for another two years and Linklater was replaced by Peter Berg as director, Barr made some favorable impressions. Producer Ann Walker Mclay, Linklater, and collaborator and director Clark Lee Walker offered him the lead role in their film Levelland that was being shot in Austin in the late spring and early summer of 2002.

Half a year after the filming of Levelland ended, in January 2003, Barr moved to Los Angeles, where his first acting job was a scene on the television show ER.

Career
Some of Barr's roles include playing Ian Banks, Peyton Sawyer's (played by Hilarie Burton) stalker on One Tree Hill. Barr has also portrayed guest and recurring roles on popular television series ER, Bones, The O.C. and Commander in Chief. He starred as David Stanley in the direct to DVD film Protecting the King as Elvis Presley's youngest step-brother. Barr appeared in the 2008 film The House Bunny as Tyler, one of the university students.

He portrayed David "Puck" Rainey, one of the alumni of The Real World: San Francisco, in Pedro, Nick Oceano's 2008 biographical film on the life of AIDS educator Pedro Zamora. In 2009, Barr co-starred in the mystery/horror miniseries Harper's Island as Christopher "Sully" Sullivan. Between 2009 and 2010 he guest starred in many TV series, such as Castle, Trauma, Friday Night Lights, and CSI: Crime Scene Investigation. 

Barr was cast as a series regular in the CW series Hellcats, playing Dan Patch, in 2010. The series premiered on September 8, 2010. However, after one season the series was cancelled. He had a role as Billy "The Kid" Rhodes on the USA Network series Necessary Roughness in 2011.  In 2012, Barr assumed a leading role, starring in the Kevin Costner miniseries Hatfields & McCoys for the History Channel.  He portrayed Johnson "Johnse" Hatfield, who fell in love with Roseanna McCoy.  In 2013, he portrayed Christopher Porco in the TV movie "Romeo Killer: The Chris Porco Story".

In 2014, Barr appeared in a recurring role on Sleepy Hollow as Nick Hawley in season 2.

Filmography

Film

Television

Web

References

External links
 

1984 births
21st-century American male actors
American male film actors
American male television actors
Living people
Male actors from Texas
People from Allen, Texas